Nand Kishore Chaudhary (born 13 June 1953) is an Indian social entrepreneur.  He currently serves as the Chairman and Managing Director of the social enterprise Jaipur Rugs, which he founded in 1978.

Early life
Nand Kishore Chaudhary was born in a Marwari family in the Churu district of Rajasthan. Growing up as an introverted child and avid reader, he was influenced by the works of Gandhi and Tagore. He went to school in Churu and graduated from Government College in Lohia in 1973. 

Nand Kishore was inspired by British researcher and designer Ilay Cooper to get into the business of carpet manufacture and design, and therefore help in the revival of this neglected art. Nand Kishore decided not to follow his father in their traditional family business of shoe-making, and even let go of a government job in a national bank. Instead, he went into the rug and carpet business. His venture started with a loan of 5000 rupees, that he borrowed from his father, and today that venture is known as Jaipur Rugs, an exemplary model of social entrepreneurship at its best.

Career
N. K. Chaudhary established the social business model of Jaipur Rugs, connecting weavers with global markets by building a global supply chain focused on developing human capability and skills at the grassroots level. Jaipur Rugs provides a steady income for people living in the most rural parts of India by connecting them with markets across the world.

Nanda Kishore started a humble carpet business in 1978 with just two weaving-looms and 9 artisans. That has today transformed into Jaipur Rugs, which is a network of more than 40,000 artisans across 6 states in India and is one of India's leading manufacturer and exporter of hand woven rugs, bringing in an annual revenue of $18 million. Jaipur Rugs has become an ecosystem of companies and organizations, and the 40,000 weavers and their families are an integral part in this ecosystem.

Personal life 
Nanda Kishore is married to Sulochana. They have five children, Asha, Archana, Kavita, Yogesh and Nitesh, all of whom are involved in specific roles in the Jaipur Rugs Company.

Honours and awards
Nand Kishore’s vision is to create the best artisan proposition for the global hand-woven carpet industry, by connecting the artisans and customers directly to each other and nurturing co-creation. NK says,  “I am not the owner of this business, the real owners are people who put in their hard work to produce beautiful carpets which are liked by customers around the world.” 

His vision has earned him acclaim across the world and he has been felicitated with many awards for the same.

 Ernst & Young Entrepreneur Of The Year 2010 for the best Start-Up. NKC received the only global business award of Ernst & Young Entrepreneur of the Year-Start Up 2010. This award commemorates and encourages the most resilient of Indian entrepreneurs. NKC's innovative thinking and entrepreneurial success became synonymous of his victory.
 Distinguished Entrepreneur Award in the year 2010 by PHD Chamber of Commerce. In order to bestow recognition to Indian businesses and Entrepreneurs for Outstanding achievements, NKC received "Distinguished Entrepreneurship Award" where the theme of the annual session was "Inclusive Growth thru Skill Development – Vision 2017"
 Game Changer Award by The HR Club on 7 February 2015
 India Pride Award 2011 - Social Change Agents prize at the inaugural ceremony of the India Pride Awards 2011, for giving employment to more than 40,000 carpet artisans in 10 states in India and being a Change Agent in the field of Social Development and Equity.
 Karmaveer Puraskaar 2012 - The KARMAVEER PURASKAAR AWARD bestowed upon our founder member as Real Wealth Creator for the communities KVP, 2012.

Publications and Accredations
Jaipur Rugs has become synonymous with N. K. Chaudhary’s principles of equality, socialism, and love, which he maintains are the real foundation of the Jaipur Rugs ecosystem. Nand Kishore has chronicled his journey with Jaipur Rugs in his own writings. These are available as e-books at his website https://www.nkchaudhary.com/. The journey of Jaipur Rugs has found international acclaim and has also been mentioned in many publications worldwide, such as:

 Fortune at the Bottom of the Pyramid 

‘Fortune at the Bottom of the Pyramid’ by CK Prahalad was published in 2009. It acclaimed Jaipur Rugs all over the world. 

 Take Me Home 

Published in 2014, Rashmi Bansal talked about N. K. Chaudhary and Jaipur Rugs, from its very inception to the scale it has achieved now, in her book Take Me Home. 

 Healing Organisation 

Published in 2019, Raj Sisodia and Michael J. Gelb covered Jaipur Rugs in their book ‘The Healing Organisation’ describing NK’s vision of innocence and Jaipur Rugs’ as an ashram.

References

External links
 

1953 births
Living people
Indian chief executives
People from Churu district
Indian social entrepreneurs
20th-century Indian businesspeople
Businesspeople from Rajasthan